is the day before the beginning of spring in the old calendar in Japan. In its association with the Lunar New Year, though not the official New Year, was thought of as similar in its ritual and cultural associations of 'cleansing' the previous year as the beginning of the new season of spring.  was accompanied by a number of rituals and traditions held at various levels to drive away the previous year's bad fortunes and evil spirits for the year to come.

History
According to the Japanese history book ,  was first held in Japan in 706, and it was an event to ward off evil spirits held at the court on the last day of the year according to the lunar-solar calendar. At that time,  was an event to drive away evil spirits that brought misfortune and disease by decorating each gate of the palace with clay figures of cows and children and using peach branches and walking sticks. It was quite different from the  known today.

Every household of the aristocracy and samurai class threw beans from their houses into the open air. The , a dictionary compiled during the Muromachi period, states that the practice of bean-throwing during  originated from a legend in the 10th century, during the reign of Emperor Uda, that a monk on Mt. Kurama escaped misfortune by blinding  with roasted beans.

From the Edo period (1603–1867), the custom of throwing beans at Shinto shrines, Buddhist temples, and homes of ordinary people spread throughout Japan as an event or festival to drive away evil spirits during . It was also during this period that the custom of tying roasted sardine heads to holly sprig to decorate the gates of houses during  began. This custom was intended to scare away  with the thorns of the holly leaves and the smell of the roasted sardines.

On , people face the most auspicious direction of the year and eat the whole , an uncut sushi roll, to pray for prosperity and happiness for the year. The name  may have spread throughout Japan in 1989, when a Japanese convenience store chain renamed it  and began selling it.

Traditions

The beans are thought to symbolically purify the home by driving away the evil spirits that bring misfortune and bad health with them. Then, as part of bringing luck in, it is customary to eat roasted soybeans, one for each year of one's life, plus one more for bringing good luck for the year.

The custom of  first appeared in the Muromachi period, and is usually performed by either a man of the household born in the corresponding zodiac year for the new year, or else the male head of the household.

Because Watanabe no Tsuna, a retainer of Minamoto no Yorimitsu during the Heian period (794–1185), is associated with the legend that he vanquished  historically considered to be the strongest, such as Shuten-doji and Ibaraki-doji, there is a tradition that  stay away from people named Watanabe and their houses. For this reason, some families with the surname Watanabe have not practiced the custom of throwing beans on Setsubun for generations. Watanabe no Tsuna was the first person to take the surname Watanabe, and Watanabe is the fifth most common surname in Japan, with approximately 1.08 million people .

In other areas, priests and invited guests throw packets of roasted soybeans, some wrapped in gold or silver foil, small envelopes with money, sweets, candies and other prizes. In some bigger and more central shrines, celebrities and sumo wrestlers are invited to celebrations, usually to  events that are televised. At Sensō-ji in the Asakusa neighborhood of Tokyo, crowds of nearly 100,000 people attend the annual festivities.

Other practices

Charts are published and occasionally packaged with uncut  during February.

Other practices include the putting up of small decorations of sardine heads and ) at the entrance to a house to ward off evil spirits.

Historical practices
The new year was felt to be a time when the spirit world became close to the physical world, thus the need to perform  to drive away any wandering spirits that might happen too close to one's home. Other customs during this time included religious dances, festivals, and bringing tools inside the house that might normally be left outside, to prevent the spirits from harming them. Rice cakes were also balanced on lintels and windowsills.

Because  is considered to be a day set apart from the rest of the year, a tradition of role reversal in appearance and dress was also practiced; such customs included girls wearing the hairstyles of older women and vice versa, wearing disguises, and cross-dressing.

Their vagrancy worked to their advantage in these cases, as they were considered to take evil spirits with them.

Regional variations
In the Tōhoku area of Japan, the head of the household (traditionally the father) would take roasted beans in his hand, pray at the family shrine, and then toss the sanctified beans out the door. Peanuts (either raw or coated in a sweet, crunchy batter) are sometimes used in place of soybeans.

There are many variations on the famous  chant. For example, in the city of Aizuwakamatsu, people chant

See also

 Exorcism
 Feast of the Lemures (a similar Roman custom)
 Holidays of Japan
 
 
 
 
 Taoism in Japan
 Zvončari (the custom dating to pagan times in Croatia whose goal is to scare away evil spirits of winter and to stir up new springtime cycle)

References

External links

Ultimate Guide to Setsubun: Soybeans, Ogre, and Sushi
Japan-guide – Setsubun
Bean scatterer calculator
Japanlinked – Setsubun
Setsubun (Bean Throwing Festival)
Miscellaneous Notes on Setsubun (in Japanese)

February observances
Buddhist festivals in Japan
Oni
Japanese words and phrases